Jarosław Leon Iwaszkiewicz, also known under his literary pseudonym Eleuter (20 February 1894 – 2 March 1980), was a Polish writer, poet, essayist, dramatist and translator. He is recognized for his literary achievements, beginning with poetry and prose written after World War I. After 1989, he was often presented as a political opportunist during his mature years lived in communist Poland, where he held high offices (participated in the slander of Polish expatriates, literary and other figures who after World War II remained in the West). He was nominated for the Nobel Prize in Literature four times. In 1988, he was recognized as a Righteous Among the Nations for his role in sheltering Jews during World War II.

Biography 

Iwaszkiewicz was born in Kalnyk in Kiev Governorate of the Russian Empire (now Vinnytsia Oblast, Ukraine). After the death of his father (an accountant), he and his mother lived in Warsaw in 1902–1904, and then moved back to Kiev Governorate. He graduated from a secondary school in Kiev in 1912 and enrolled at the Law Faculty of Kiev University.

In 1914, he travelled in Sicily and North Africa with his friend and distant cousin Karol Szymanowski, a composer for whose opera King Roger he later provided the libretto. After World War I, in October 1918 Iwaszkiewicz came to Warsaw, where he joined a group of young artists associated with the Pro Arte et Studio magazine. He had his public debut as a poet at the Pod Picadorem café on 29 November. With Julian Tuwim and Antoni Słonimski, he founded the Skamander group of experimental poets in 1919.

He was appointed to be secretary of Maciej Rataj, marshal of the Sejm of the Second Polish Republic and served in that capacity in 1923–1925. Iwaszkiewicz worked for a magazine called Wiadomości Literackie ('The Literary News') in 1924–1939; he also published his works in numerous periodicals, including  Gazeta Polska (1934–1938) and Ateneum (1938–1939). He was secretary to the Society for the Encouragement of Fine Arts (Towarzystwo Zachęty Sztuk Pięknych) and from 1925 a member of the Polish PEN Club. From 1927 with the Foreign Ministry, first appointed the head of the art promotion section of the Press Department and later sent as secretary of the Polish mission to Copenhagen (1932–1935) and Brussels (1935–1936). He was a member of The Trade Union of Polish Writers (Związek Zawodowy Literatów Polskich, ZZLP) and in 1939 voted its vice-president.

During World War II, Iwaszkiewicz participated in the Polish Underground State's activities, working in the Department of Education, Science and Culture of the Government Delegation for Poland. He collaborated with Prof. Stanisław Lorentz in his efforts to protect and rescue Poland's works of art. Iwaszkiewicz and his wife Anna had extensive contacts within the Jewish-Polish intelligentsia circles and assisted their former neighbors, friends and acquaintances in a variety of ways during the German occupation of Poland. Iwaszkiewicz family's Villa Stawisko residence served as a hiding place for many Jews and Poles who faced the threat of being arrested by Nazi Germans, especially after the fall of the Warsaw Uprising in 1944. At one time, more than 40 people were sheltered in the mansion. During the war, Stawisko also functioned as a center of Polish underground literature and art.

In 1945–1946, 1947–1949 and 1959–1980, Iwaszkiewicz served as head of the Polish Writers' Union. In 1945–1949 and 1955–1957 he was literary manager of the Polish Theatre in Warsaw. From March 1947 to December 1949, he published the Nowiny literackie ('Literary News') magazine. Beginning in 1956, for many years he was chief editor of the monthly Twórczość ('Creativity'). Vice-president of the Polish PEN Club in 1950–1965.

Iwaszkiewicz was an organizer of the World Congress of Intellectuals in Defense of Peace held in Wrocław in 1948 and a delegate to the World Peace Congress in 1950.

He served as a nonpartisan member of parliament from 1952 until his death in 1980. In his last three terms, he was the Senior Marshal of the Sejm. Iwaszkiewicz wrote of his deeply socialist convictions, but was ambivalent and privately bitter about the political reality of the Polish People's Republic, within which he officially functioned. Nevertheless, he was greatly impressed by the appreciation note that he received from Bolesław Bierut on the 40th anniversary of Iwaszkiewicz's literary career. In 1956, he was thrilled by the Polish October events. After a conversation with Edward Ochab in 1961, Iwaszkiewicz wrote: "They blame me for not having done anything as a member of the Sejm, but then they want me to be a deputy again". He continued his lifelong habit of making many foreign trips.

Iwaszkiewicz wrote novels and short stories, poems, dramatic works, essays and columns, and translations from French, English, Russian and Danish literatures. His major epic novel is Sława i Chwała ('Fame and Glory') – a panorama of life of Polish intelligentsia in the first half of the 20th century. In particular, he is highly regarded for his short stories, a genre he developed and modernized. Using changing forms and themes, throughout his career Iwaszkiewicz produced collections of poems of major significance. He wrote plays based on classical motifs and many miscellaneous pieces reflecting his interests and pursuits in areas such as music and theatre, travel, and popularization of culture.

In 1936, Iwaszkiewicz won the Golden Laurel (Polish: Złoty Wawrzyn) conferred by the Polish Academy of Literature. He was twice awarded the Order of Merit of the Republic of Poland (1946 and 1947) and also the Order of the Builders of People's Poland in 1954. In 1955, he became the recipient of the Order of Merit of the Italian Republic and the Medal of the 10th Anniversary of People's Poland. In 1970, he was awarded the Lenin Peace Prize. In 1974, Edward Gierek awarded him with the Grand Cross of the Order of Polonia Restituta. He received honorary doctorates from the University of Warsaw in 1971 and the Jagiellonian University in 1979, as well as numerous other Polish, foreign and international awards and distinctions. However, Iwaszkiewicz's works were removed in Poland from school recommended readings after the collapse of the Soviet Bloc. They have since been regaining the recognition of their value and rank.

Czesław Miłosz wrote the following: "Iwaszkiewicz is a great figure and nobody who deals with Polish literature can omit him. Even if some parts of his huge literary output are excluded, there is enough left, also as a testimony to the three epochs, to secure for him a place higher than that of any of his contemporaries". He concluded, "One is almost inclined to believe that some people are gripped by circumstances meant for them, and that for him the good fortunes, after his impoverished youth, began in the interwar period, to endure also later". For Miłosz could not imagine Iwaszkiewicz as an émigré personality.

Iwaszkiewicz died on 2 March 1980 and was buried on 5 March at the cemetery in Brwinów near Warsaw, according to his last wish in a miner's uniform.

Personal life

In 1922, Iwaszkiewicz married Anna Lilpop (1897–1979), a writer and translator and daughter of Stanisław Wilhelm Lilpop, a wealthy entrepreneur. The couple settled in Podkowa Leśna near Warsaw. In 1928, they moved to a newly built villa that Iwaszkiewicz named Stawisko. It currently houses a museum devoted to Iwaszkiewicz and his wife. They had two daughters: Maria (1924–2019) and Teresa (1928–2012). Iwaszkiewicz was bisexual and homoerotic; those themes are present in his poetry and prose works. In his diaries he describes himself as a "homosexual"; however, in light of the current understanding of human sexual orientation and his biography, he can be characterized as a bisexual. Iwaszkiewicz experienced and described a particularly intense relationship with a younger man terminally ill with tuberculosis; it commenced when the writer was over sixty years old. His wife always "knew of all of his affections".

In 2012, his great-granddaughter Ludwika Włodek wrote a best-selling biographical book about the life of her great-grandfather, titled Pra.

Works

Short stories 

 Panny z Wilka ('The Wilko Girls'); Brzezina ('The Birch Grove'), Warsaw 1933
 Młyn nad Utratą ('The Mill on the River Utrata'), Warsaw 1936
 Dwa opowiadania ('Two Stories'), Warsaw 1938
 Nowa miłość i inne opowiadania ('New Love and Other Stories'), Warsaw 1946
 Tatarak i inne opowiadania ('Calamus and Other Stories'), Warsaw 1960
 Heidenreich. Cienie. Dwa opowiadania ('Heidenreich. Shadows. Two Stories'), Poznań 1964

Novels 

 Zenobia Palmura, Poznań 1920
 Ucieczka do Bagdadu ('Escape to Baghdad'), Warsaw 1923
 Hilary, syn buchaltera ('Hilary, Son of a Bookkeeper'), Warsaw 1923
 Księżyc wschodzi ('The Moon Rises'), Warsaw 1925
 Zmowa mężczyzn  ('Conspiracy of Men'), Warsaw 1930
 Czerwone tarcze ('Red Shields'), Warsaw 1934
 Sława i chwała ('Fame and Glory'), vol. 1–3, Warsaw 1956–1962

Poetry 

 Oktostychy ('Octostichs'), Warsaw 1919
 Dionizje ('Dionysiacs'), Warsaw 1922
 Kaskady zakończone siedmioma wierszami ('Cascades Ending in Seven Poems'), Warsaw 1925
 Pejzaże sentymentalne ('Sentimental Landscapes'), Warsaw 1926
 Ksiega dnia i księga nocy ('The Book of Day and the Book of Night'), Warsaw 1929
 Powrót do Europy ('Return to Europe'), Warsaw 1931
 Lato 1932 ('Summer 1932'), 1933
 Inne życie ('Another Life'), 1938
 Ody olimpijskie ('Olympian Odes'), Warsaw 1948
 Warkocz jesieni ('The Plait of Autumn'), Warsaw 1954
 Ciemne ścieżki ('Dark Paths'), Warsaw 1957
 Jutro żniwa ('Harvest Tomorrow'), Warsaw 1963
 Krągły rok ('Year Round'), Warsaw 1967
 Xenie i elegie ('Xenias and Elegies'), Warsaw 1970
 Śpiewnik włoski ('Italian Songbook'), Warsaw 1974
 Mapa pogody ('Weather Map'), Warsaw 1977

Plays 

 Libretto to Karol Szymanowski's King Roger; premiere in Teatr Wielki, Warsaw 1926. Szymanowski completely re-wrote the third act libretto.
 Kochankowie z Werony. Tragedia romatyczna w 3 aktach ('The Lovers of Verona. Romantic Tragedy in 3 Acts'); premiere in Teatr Nowy, Warsaw 1930
 Lato w Nohant. Komedia w 3 aktach ('The Summer at Nohant. Comedy in 3 Acts'); premiere in Teatr Mały, Warsaw 1936
 Maskarada. Melodramat w 4 Aktach ('Masquerade. Melodrama in 4 Acts'); premiere in Teatr Polski, Warsaw 1938
 Odbudowa Błędomierza. Sztuka w 3 aktach ('The Rebuilding of Błędomierz. Play in 3 Acts'); premiere in Teatr Stary, Kraków 1951
 Wesele Pana Balzaka ('The Wedding of Mr. Balzac'); premiere in Teatr Kameralny, Warsaw 1959
 Kosmogonia ('Cosmogony'); premiere in Teatr Polski, Warsaw 1967

(Lato w Nohant is based on an episode in Frédéric Chopin's life and Maskarada on Alexander Pushkin's final days.)

Adaptations

Films

Matka Joanna od aniołów ('Mother Joan of the Angels') by Jerzy Kawalerowicz 1961
Kochankowie z Marony ('The Lovers of Marona') by Jerzy Zarzycki 1966
Brzezina ('The Birch Grove' ) by Andrzej Wajda 1970
Panny z Wilka ('The Wilko Girls') by Andrzej Wajda 1979
Ryś (('The Lynx'), based on Iwaszkiewicz's short story Kościół w Skaryszewie ('The Church in Skaryszew')) by Stanisław Różewicz 1981
Kochankowie z Marony ('The Lovers of Marona') by Izabela Cywińska 2005
Tatarak ('Calamus') by Andrzej Wajda 2009

See also
 Polish literature

References

Further reading 

R. Matuszewski, Iwaszkiewicz, Warszawa, 1965.
J. Rohoziński, "Jarosław Iwaszkiewicz. Życie i twórczość" in Jarosław Iwaszkiewicz, Warszawa, 1968.
T. Wroczyński, Późna eseistyka Jarosława Iwaszkiewicza, Warszawa, 1990.
T. Wójcik, Pejzaż w poezji Jarosława Iwaszkiewicza, Warszawa, 1993.
B. Dorosz, Jarosław Iwaszkiewicz. Bibliografia, Warszawa, 1994.
A. Zawada, Jarosław Iwaszkiewicz, Wiedza Powszechna, Warszawa, 1994.
"Panny z Wilka” Jarosława Iwaszkiewicza. Rozbiory, red. I. Iwasiów, J. Madejski, Szczecin, 1996.
S. Melkowski, Świat opowiadań. Krótkie formy w prozie Jarosława Iwaszkiewicza po roku 1939, Toruń, 1997.
M. Radziwon, Iwaszkiewicz. Pisarz po katastrofie, Wydawnictwo W.A.B., Warszawa 2010
R. Romaniuk, Inne życie. Biografia Jarosława Iwaszkiewicza, Iskry, t.I Warszawa 2012, t.II Warszawa 2017

External links

 Jarosław Iwaszkiewicz at Culture.pl

1894 births
1980 deaths
People from Vinnytsia Oblast
People from Kiev Governorate
Members of the Polish Sejm 1952–1956
Members of the Polish Sejm 1961–1965
Members of the Polish Sejm 1965–1969
Members of the Polish Sejm 1969–1972
Members of the Polish Sejm 1972–1976
Members of the Polish Sejm 1976–1980
Polish male dramatists and playwrights
Ballet librettists
Polish LGBT poets
Polish LGBT dramatists and playwrights
Polish bisexual people
Polish diarists
Bisexual men
Bisexual poets
Bisexual dramatists and playwrights
Recipients of the Order of the Builders of People's Poland
Lenin Peace Prize recipients
Opera librettists
Polish male poets
Male essayists
20th-century Polish poets
20th-century Polish dramatists and playwrights
20th-century Polish male writers
20th-century essayists
Polish Righteous Among the Nations
Olympic competitors in art competitions
Recipients of the State Award Badge (Poland)
20th-century diarists